Robert Bulkeley, 2nd Viscount Bulkeley of Cashel (died 18 October 1688) was a British peer and politician.

He was born the second son of Thomas Bulkeley, 1st Viscount Bulkeley of Baron Hill, Beaumaris and inherited the title from his father after his elder brother Richard was murdered. His mother was Blanche Cotymore, daughter of Richard Cotymore.

He was appointed Sheriff of Anglesey for 1658  and elected the Member of Parliament for Anglesey for 1660–1661, Caernarvonshire, 1675–1679, and Anglesey for the second time from 1685 to 1689.

He married Sarah, the daughter of Daniel Hervey of Coombe in Surrey. They had three sons and six daughters. He was succeeded by his eldest son Richard. Of his younger sons, Robert Bulkeley (died 1702), became MP for Beaumaris and Thomas became MP for Caernarvonshire.

References

1688 deaths
Viscounts in the Peerage of Ireland
Members of the Parliament of England (pre-1707) for constituencies in Wales
High Sheriffs of Anglesey
Robert
17th-century Welsh politicians
English MPs 1660
English MPs 1661–1679
English MPs 1685–1687
Year of birth unknown
People from Beaumaris